Minuscule 44 (in the Gregory-Aland numbering), ε 239 (von Soden), is a Greek minuscule manuscript of the New Testament, on parchment leaves. Palaeographically it has been assigned to the 12th century. It has complex contents and full marginalia.

Description 

The codex contains complete text of the four Gospels on 259 leaves with size . The text is written in one column per page, 21-22 lines per page. In Gospel of Matthew verses 16:2b-3 (signs of the times) are omitted.

There is also another division according to the smaller Ammonian Sections (in Mark 234 sections, the last numbered section in 16:9), with references to the Eusebian Canons.

Text 

The Greek text of the codex is a representative of the Byzantine text-type. Hermann von Soden classified it to the textual family Family E. Aland placed it in Category V.

According to the Claremont Profile Method it represents  textual family Kx in Luke 1, Luke 10, and Luke 20. It belongs to the textual cluster 1434 in Luke 20.
It does not contain Jesus and the woman taken in adultery (John 7:53-8:11).

 Textual variants
 Matt 2,1 – Ἰεροσόλυμα ] Ἰερουσαλήμ 
 Matt 2,11 – εὗρον ] εἶδον 
 Matt 2,23 – Ναζαρέτ ] Ναζαρὰ

History 

The manuscript was dated by Scholz to the 11th century. Gregory dated it to the 12th century. Currently it has been assigned by the INTF to the 12th century.

The codex was brought from Athos to England by César de Missy (1703-1775), French chaplain of George III, King of England, who spent his life in collecting materials for an edition of the New Testament. It was examined by Amelotte, Simon, Wetstein in 1746, Scholz, and Bloomfield (1860). Wettstein gave a collation, but very imperfect.

It was added to the list of the New Testament manuscripts by Wettstein. C. R. Gregory saw it in 1883.

It is currently housed in at the British Library (Add MS 4949), at London.

See also 

 List of New Testament minuscules
 Biblical manuscript
 Textual criticism

References

External links 

 Add MS 4949 BL

Greek New Testament minuscules
12th-century biblical manuscripts
Palimpsests
British Library additional manuscripts